Oenothera lindheimeri,<ref>[https://www.itis.gov/servlet/SingleRpt/SingleRpt?search_topic=TSN&search_value=835999 ITIS Standard Report Page: Oenothera lindheimeri] . accessed 8.1.2013</ref> commonly known as Lindheimer's beeblossom, white gaura, pink gaura, Lindheimer's clockweed, and Indian feather, is a species of Oenothera.

The perennial plant is native to southern Louisiana and Texas.USDA Plants Profile: Gaura lindheimeri  The specific epithet is after Ferdinand Jacob Lindheimer, a German-born botanist who collected extensively in Texas for Harvard University professor Asa Gray.

(1992). New RHS Dictionary of Gardening. Macmillan .

CultivationOenothera lindheimeri is commonly grown as an ornamental plant. It is used in either garden beds or pots for accent colour and a delicate texture. It grows best in full sun and can survive lengthy periods of drought.

Several cultivars have been selected for varying flower color, from nearly pure white in 'Whirling Butterflies' to darker pink in 'Cherry Brandy' and 'Siskiyou Pink'. In some, the petals are white at dawn then turning pink before falling off at dusk.

Although a perennial rated USDA Zone 5(6)-9 for hardiness it may not overwinter reliably, and is often treated as an annual outside its native areas. In colder climates a heavy winter mulch is necessary.

This plant has gained the Royal Horticultural Society's Award of Garden Merit.

EtymologyGaura: Derived from Greek  (gaûros) meaning "superb". Named in reference to the stature and floral display of some species in this genus.Lindheimeri: Named for Ferdinand Lindheimer (1801–79), who discovered the plant Lindheimera texana''.

References

External links

Floridata: Gaura lindheimeri
Missouri Botanical Garden: Gaura lindheimeri

lindheimeri
Flora of Louisiana
Flora of Texas
Taxa named by Asa Gray
Garden plants of North America
Drought-tolerant plants